The Good Hope Concerts is a live album from Juluka, a South African band led by Johnny Clegg and Sipho Mchunu. It was first released in 1986. It was recorded at the Good Hope Centre in Cape Town. The concerts were Clegg's first major successes in Cape Town and were promoted by local record label Mountain Records.

Track listing

Singles 

No singles taken from this album.

Technical Personnel 

Produced by: Hilton Rosenthal
Recording Engineer: Kevin Shirley
Remix Engineer: Bobby Summerfield

Personnel
 Johnny Clegg - vocals, guitar
 Sipho Mchunu - guitar, percussion, vocals
 Gary Van Zyl - bass guitar, percussion, vocals
 Derek de Beer - drums, percussion, vocals
 Cyril Mnculwane - keyboards, vocals
 Scorpion Madondo - flute, saxophone, vocals

Catalog Numbers and Other Identifiers 

LP: MINC(V)4051481
Cassette: L4MINC(EV)4051484
CD: CDM4051482
Barcode: 6002140514816

Companies Etc. 

Phonographic Copyright (P): EMI Music South Africa (Pty) Ltd
Marketed by: EMI Music South Africa (Pty) Ltd
Distributed by: EMI Music South Africa (Pty) Ltd

Juluka albums
1986 live albums
Live albums by South African artists